Jorge Rodríguez (born 8 March 1990) is a Puerto Rican international soccer player who played college soccer for the Hartford Hawks, as a defender.

Career
Rodríguez played college soccer for the Hartford Hawks from 2008-2011.

He made his international debut for Puerto Rico in 2011, and has appeared in FIFA World Cup qualifying matches.

References

1990 births
Living people
Puerto Rican footballers
Puerto Rico international footballers
Association football defenders